John Newcome, D.D.  (10 September 1684 – 10 January 1765) was an eighteenth-century academic and priest, most notably Master of St John's College, Cambridge from 1735, and Dean of Rochester from 1744, holding both positions until his death. He was born in Grantham and died in Cambridge. Newcome's wife, Susanna Newcome, was an English philosopher and theologian.

References

1765 deaths
18th-century scholars
Masters of St John's College, Cambridge
Deans of Rochester
People from Grantham
Lady Margaret's Professors of Divinity